Parc de Montjuïc is the upper station of the Funicular de Montjuïc, which is operated by Transports Metropolitans de Barcelona (TMB) as part of the Barcelona Metro. The station serves the hill of Montjuïc and the various sporting and other facilities there.

The funicular accepts Autoritat del Transport Metropolità (ATM) tickets, and the station therefore has ticket machines and barriers identical to those of all other Barcelona metro stations. The station has twin platforms, one on each side of the terminal track. Because of the gradient at the upper end of the funicular, the stations platforms are stepped, but disabled access is provided to the upper step of the platform.

The funicular station is adjacent to the lower station of the Montjuïc Cable Car, a gondola lift that continues uphill to a terminal near the Montjuïc Castle on the summit of the hill. Whilst operated by the TMB, the cable car does not accept metro ticketing, and passengers must exit one station before entering the other.

Gallery

References

External links
 

Funicular de Montjuïc stations
Railway stations in Spain opened in 1928
Transport in Sants-Montjuïc